Top Room at the Zoo is the debut independently released album by English musician Lucy Spraggan. It was released in the United Kingdom on 20 October 2011. The album includes the song "Last Night", which she performed the song at The X Factor auditions in 2012.

Background
Originally Spraggan released the album independently in the United Kingdom on 20 October 2011. After she sang "Last Night" at The X Factor auditions the album peaked to number 2 on iTunes but the album had to be removed by request of The X Factor producers due to a rule change. She was told to take down her album and informed that all other The X Factor contestants this year have also been banned until the show is over, in order to give them the same level of exposure. In an interview Spraggan said a short-lived romance with an older woman of 27, when she visited America at the age of 18, inspired the majority of her album's lyrics.

Track listing

Chart performance
On 29 August 2012 the album was at number 7 on the Official Chart Update despite the album being removed from iTunes. On 30 August 2012 the album entered the Irish Albums Chart at number 72. On 2 September 2012 the album entered the UK Albums Chart at number 22.

Weekly charts

Release history

References

2011 debut albums
Lucy Spraggan albums